Estevan Sound is a sound on the North Coast of British Columbia, extending northwest from Caamaño Sound between Campania Island (E) and the Estevan Group archipelago (W).

References

North Coast of British Columbia
Spanish history in the Pacific Northwest
Sounds of British Columbia
Sound